Pov Malis Lea is a 1993 film starring  Arun Reksemy, Sok Sreymom, Tep Rundaro, Pisith Pilika, Kai Prasith, Ampor Tevi and other stars of the time.

Cast
Arun Reksemy
Sok Sreymom
Tep Rundaro
Pisith Pilika
Kai Prasith
Ampor Tevi
Som Dara
Neary Roth Kunthea

1993 films
Khmer-language films
Cambodian drama films